Jorge Djaniny Tavares Semedo (born 21 March 1991), known as Djaniny, is a Cape Verdean professional footballer who plays for Sharjah on loan from Trabzonspor as a forward.

After achieving 75 games and 12 goals in the Portuguese Primeira Liga for União Leiria, Olhanense and Nacional, he won club and individual honours with Santos Laguna in Mexico, Al Ahli in Saudi Arabia, Trabzonspor of Turkey and Sharjah in the United Arab Emirates.

Djaniny was first capped by Cape Verde in 2012, and represented the country at the Africa Cup of Nations in 2013 and 2015.

Club career

União Leiria
Born in Santa Cruz, Djaniny arrived in Portugal at the age of 18 to study alternative energy, immediately starting playing football with Azores-based Grupo Desportivo Velense, a regional league club from Angra do Heroísmo. On 18 July 2011, after scoring 50 goals in two seasons, the 20-year-old moved straight into the Primeira Liga, signing for three years with U.D. Leiria. He made his competitive debut on 21 August, playing the full 90 minutes in a 2–1 away loss against F.C. Paços de Ferreira.

Djaniny scored his first goal as a professional on 30 October 2011, in the 2–0 home win over Vitória de Setúbal. The following matchday he added another, in a 3–1 defeat at Sporting CP.

Benfica
Djaniny agreed terms with S.L. Benfica in January 2012, being assigned to the resurrected reserve team which competed in the Segunda Liga in the 2012–13 campaign. On 31 August he moved teams again, being loaned to top division side S.C. Olhanense for one year.

Djaniny failed to find the net in nine starts for the Algarve team, who avoided relegation by one point.

Nacional
On 16 July 2013, Djaniny terminated his contract with Benfica and signed a permanent deal with C.D. Nacional also in the top flight. He scored eight goals in all competitions in his only season in Madeira, including one in the Taça da Liga against Gil Vicente F.C. (2–2 group stage draw) and another in the league against Benfica (2–4 home loss).

Santos Laguna
Djaniny moved to Mexican club Santos Laguna on 24 June 2014, reuniting with his former Leiria coach Pedro Caixinha. He scored his first goal in the Liga MX on 10 August, but in a 3–2 defeat to Querétaro F.C. at the Estadio Corona.

In the 2018 Clausura, Djaniny netted 14 times to help his team be crowned national champions for the sixth time in their history. In the process, he became the first African player to win the competition's top scorer award.

Al-Ahli
On 13 July 2018, Djaniny signed with Al-Ahli Saudi FC who paid his release clause. On 11 January of the following year, he scored all of his team's goals as they defeated Ohod Club 5–1.

Trabzonspor
Djaniny joined Trabzonspor on a three-year contract on 4 October 2020. The following 27 January, he opened the 2–1 victory over İstanbul Başakşehir F.K. in the Turkish Super Cup. 

In the 2021–22 campaign, Djaniny was an integral part of the squad that secured the club's first Süper Lig title in 38 years.

Djaniny moved on loan to Sharjah FC of the UAE Pro League for the second half of the 2022–23 season. On his debut on 10 February, he scored and assisted Paco Alcácer in a 4–0 home win over Ajman Club to go top of the table. Fifteen days later he featured in a 1–0 win over reigning league champions Al Ain FC in the UAE Super Cup.

International career
Djaniny received his first call-up for Cape Verde in late 2011. He scored his first international goal in a 2013 Africa Cup of Nations qualifier against Madagascar, on 16 June of the following year. On 8 September, in his next match against Cameroon, he concluded a 2–0 win over Cameroon at the Estádio da Várzea.

Djaniny went to the Africa Cup of Nations in 2013 and 2015, helping to a quarter-final finish at the former.

Career statistics

Club

International

Cape Verde score listed first, score column indicates score after each Djaniny goal

Honours
Santos Laguna
Liga MX: Clausura 2015, Clausura 2018
Copa MX: Apertura 2014
Campeón de Campeones: 2015

Trabzonspor
Süper Lig: 2021–22
Turkish Super Cup: 2020, 2022

Sharjah
UAE Super Cup: 2022

Individual
Liga MX top scorer: Clausura 2018
Saudi Professional League Player of the Month: January 2019

References

External links

1991 births
Living people
Cape Verdean footballers
Association football forwards
Primeira Liga players
Liga Portugal 2 players
U.D. Leiria players
S.L. Benfica B players
S.C. Olhanense players
C.D. Nacional players
Liga MX players
Santos Laguna footballers
Saudi Professional League players
Al-Ahli Saudi FC players
Süper Lig players
Trabzonspor footballers
Cape Verde international footballers
2013 Africa Cup of Nations players
2015 Africa Cup of Nations players
Cape Verdean expatriate footballers
Expatriate footballers in Portugal
Expatriate footballers in Mexico
Expatriate footballers in Saudi Arabia
Expatriate footballers in Turkey
Cape Verdean expatriate sportspeople in Portugal
Cape Verdean expatriate sportspeople in Saudi Arabia
Cape Verdean expatriate sportspeople in Turkey